Outrage Games (formerly Outrage Entertainment) was an American video game developer based in Ann Arbor, Michigan. Founded in December 1997 by Matt Toschlog as part of the split-up of Parallax Software, the company developed Descent 3 (released in 1999) and Alter Echo (2003). The company was acquired by THQ in April 2002 and shut down in 2003.

History 
Outrage was founded by Matt Toschlog after he and his business partner, Mike Kulas, decided to split up their venture Parallax Software into two separate companies. The split was formally announced on December 1, 1997, in which Toschlog formed Outrage and Kulas established Volition. Outrage first developed Descent 3, a successor to Parallax's Descent 2. Descent 3 was released in June 1999 to a poor sales performance.

On April 4, 2002, THQ announced that it had acquired Outrage to undisclosed terms. Rubu Tribe, a game that had been in development at Outrage and was to be published by Interplay Entertainment, was subsequently canceled. In 2003, Outrage developed the ports of Volition's Red Faction II for Microsoft Windows and Xbox. The studio's next game, Alter Echo, was released the same year. As a result of cost reduction measures taken by THQ, Outrage was shut down sometime during THQ's first fiscal quarter of 2003, which ended on June 30.

Games developed

Canceled

References 

Companies based in Ann Arbor, Michigan
Defunct companies based in Michigan
Defunct video game companies of the United States
Descent (series)
THQ
Video game companies disestablished in 2004
Video game companies established in 1997
Video game development companies